The BMW i is a sub-brand of BMW founded in 2011 to design and manufacture plug-in electric vehicles. The company initially released two vehicles: the i3 all-electric car and the i8 plug-in hybrid. The all-electric iX3 SUV was released in late 2020, while iX SUV and the i4 all-electric liftback sedan followed later in 2021.

Concept versions of both the i3 and i8 were shown at the 2009 Frankfurt Motor Show. Series production of the BMW i3 for retail customers began in September 2013, and the European market launch took place in November 2013, with the first retail deliveries in Germany. The BMW i8 was launched in Germany in June 2014. The United States, Norway, Germany, and the UK are the main markets for both models.

In February 2016, BMW announced the introduction of the "iPerformance" model designation, which is being given to all BMW plug-in hybrid vehicles from July 2016. The aim is to provide a visible indicator of the transfer of technology from BMW i to the BMW core brand. , seven BMW electrified models have been released using BMW i technology, the X1 xDrive25e, X3 xDrive30e, X5 xDrive45e, 225xe Active Tourer, 320e/330e iPerformance, 520e/530e/545e iPerformance, and 745e/745Le iPerformance. The Mini Cooper S E Countryman ALL4 plug-in hybrid also shares the i technology.

Combined global sales of BMW Group electrified vehicles achieved the 500,000th unit milestone in December 2019, including BMW i, iPerformance, xDrive, and MINI brand electrified cars. Global sales of all variants of the BMW i3 reached over 165,000 units delivered at the beginning of 2020. Production of the BMW i8 ended in June 2020, with worldwide sales of more than 20,000 units.

History

Project i: BMW i3 and Life-Drive 
BMW's "Project i" is a program created to develop lightweight eco-friendly urban electric car concepts designed to address the mobility and sustainability needs for people who live in megacities. According to BMW, "Project i" has three phases. The Mini E demonstration was the first phase of this project, and it was followed by a similar field testing that began in January 2012 with the BMW ActiveE all-electric vehicle. The ActiveE was based on the BMW 1 Series Coupe and built considering the lessons learned from the Mini E trial. The last phase of "Project i" was the development of the i3 and i8 electric cars.

The automaker expected that its first series production all-electric drive vehicle would help it achieve an overall fleet fuel economy average of 6.63 L/100 km (35.5 mpg) by 2016, as mandated by U.S. federal regulations. BMW expected high volume sales of the i3 to allow the company to continue selling several of its high-performance cars with low fuel economy in the U.S.

In February 2011, BMW announced a new sub-brand, BMW i, to market the vehicles produced under Project i. BMW i vehicles are to be sold separately from BMW or Mini. Production of both plug-in electric cars was scheduled to start in Leipzig in 2013.

Global i3 sales passed the 25,000 unit milestone in May 2015. Combined global sales of the BMW i brand models passed the 30,000 mark in June 2015, and the 50,000 unit milestone in January 2016. Global sales of the BMW i3 achieved the 50,000 unit milestone in July 2016.

, BMW expects a stable development in the plug-in electric market with low profits the next 5-7 years, until batteries have doubled their capacity, with the goal to expand the share of its electrified models to between 15% and 25% of sales by 2025.

Project i 2.0: BMW iX and CLAR 

In 2017, BMW cancelled development of the third distinct model for the BMW i range with the company focusing on electrifying models in the mainstream BMW range and the self-driving iNext. Referred as "Project i 2.0", the iNext was developed to address key questions for the future of motoring, with a focus on electrification, connectivity and autonomy. The BMW iX was unveiled as fully production-ready in November 2020.

The electric models of the "Power of Choice" sustainability plan are based on the modular FAAR and CLAR architectures, where up to four different powertrain variants in each of its main model lines can be built on the same production line. These models use the fifth-generation eDrive system that incorporates the electric motor, transmission and power electronics into a single compact central housing. The BMW iX3 is the first model to be electrified and was unveiled in July 2020. The BMW i4 was revealed in March 2021 and is sold in several variants at different performance levels. The China-exclusive BMW i3, based on the long-wheelbase G28 3 Series, was revealed in March 2022. The BMW i7 and BMW iX1 were announced in April 2022 and June 2022, respectively. The BMW i5, in both sedan and wagon body style, is scheduled by October 2023 and Q1 2024, respectively. The BMW iX2 is confirmed for 2023. 

In 2019, BMW contracted Contemporary Amperex Technology and Samsung SDI to deliver lithium-ion cells for $10 billion over a decade, and BMW intends to supply them with cobalt and lithium to increase transparency.

BMW presented the BMW i Hydrogen Next SUV, a hydrogen fuel cell vehicle based on the G05 X5, at the 2019 Frankfurt Motor Show. BMW was testing the fuel cell technology with a road test fleet of F07 5 Series Gran Turismo in 2015. Production of the hydrogen fuel cells for the iX5 Hydrogen began in September 2022, and fewer than 100 vehicles were produced as part the pilot fleet.

Project i 3.0: Neue Klasse 
There had been hints to a future electric-only platform; BMW announced the Neue Klasse platform designed for electric powertrains arriving in 2025. The new platform will switch to 46mm diameter cylindrical batteries (available in two heights of 95mm and 125mm) and use an 800V electrical architecture. The battery cells themselves will continue to use NMC chemistry and will be manufactured by existing partners CATL and EVE. BMW confirmed that six models on the platform will be released between 2025 and 2027.

Stores 
The first BMW i store opened in June 2012 at BMW's London Park Lane showroom. The carmaker premiered an updated version of the BMW i3 concept electric car and unveiled its i Pedelec electric bicycle concept. On 15 November 2013, retail deliveries for the i3 began with a special ceremony in Munich.

Using eDrive in core-brand BMW models 

On 1 December 2014, BMW announced the group is planning to offer plug-in hybrid versions of all its core-brand models using eDrive technology developed for its BMW i brand plug-in vehicles. The goal of the company is to use plug-in technology to continue offering high performance vehicles while reducing  emissions below 100g/km. In February 2016, BMW announced the introduction of the "iPerformance" model designation, which will be given to all BMW plug-in hybrid vehicles from July 2016. The aim is to provide a visible indicator of the transfer of technology from BMW i to the BMW core brand.

Sales of BMW i and iPerformance designated plug-in hybrid drive models have grown strongly in Europe, accounting for 4% of all BMW vehicles sold in Western Europe in June 2016. The percentage is significantly higher in markets with strong incentives and infrastructural measures, such as Netherlands, with 14.9% of all BMW vehicles sold in June were BMW i or BMW iPerformance models, and Scandinavia with 13.2%. Combined global sales of BMW i or BMW iPerformance models totalled 23,675 units during the first half of 2016. This is the result of the expanded range of electrified models, which includes seven electrified models including plug-in hybrids. Sales of this type of vehicle during the first half of 2016 were just under 87% higher than the same period in 2015. Combined global sales of BMW i and iPerformance plug-in hybrid models achieved the 100,000 unit milestone in early November 2016, three years after the inception of the BMW i3.

Products 
, Around 7 BMW i models are offered, the BMW i3 all-electric car with optional range-extender (REx), and the BMW i8 plug-in hybrid. , BMW i vehicles are sold in 74 countries. In November 2016, BMW announced the company expected to deliver 60,000 of its electrified i and iPerformance models in 2016, and set a sales target of 100,000 units for 2017. BMW set the goal to expand the share of its electrified models to between 15% and 25% of sales by 2025.

The demand for BMW i and iPerformance vehicles increased significantly during the first half of 2016. In June 2016, 4% of all BMW sales in Western Europe were electrified cars, and again in July 2016, the electrified models captured 4% of all BMW sales in the region.

Global sales of all plug-in electrified models achieved the 100,000 unit milestone in early November 2016, consisting of more than 60,000 i3s, over 10,000 i8s, and about 30,000 from combined sales of all BMW iPerformance plug-in hybrid models. Combined global sales of BMW's electrified models totalled more than 62,000 units in 2016, and 103,080 in 2017, including MINI brand electrified vehicles.

Global sales of BMW Group's electrified vehicles passed the 250,000 unit milestone in April 2018, and the 300,000 mark in September 2018. A total of 142,617 electrified vehicles were delivered worldwide in 2018, and 145,815 in 2019. Since inception of the BMW i3, BMW Group cumulative global sales totalled 500,000 BMW and MINI electrified vehicles by mid December 2019.

BMW i3

Design and technology 

The BMW i3 is an electric car, BMW's first zero emissions mass-produced vehicle. The i3 is the first volume production vehicle on the market featuring carbon-fiber reinforced plastic. This vehicle gets its power from an electric motor powered by lithium-ion batteries.

According to BMW, at the beginning of the i3 release, the use of range-extender was much more than the carmaker expected, more than 60%. Over time it has decreased significantly, with some people almost never using it, and by early 2016 it is being regularly used in fewer than 5% of i3s.

In May 2016, BMW  announced that the 2017 model year (MY) BMW i3 will come with an improved battery pack with 50% more capacity (33 kWh) than the previous model with a corresponding range increase expected to achieve  under the EPA cycle, and  under the New European Driving Cycle. The Range Extender (REx) variant features the same higher capacity battery as the all-electric model, with a corresponding all-electric range increase. Deliveries of the 2017 MY i3 in the U.S. market began in the third quarter of 2016. Both variants with the improved battery are available in the UK starting in July 2016.

Production 
BMW invested  million to build a plant in Moses Lake, Washington to manufacture the carbon-fiber reinforced plastic used on the vehicles' body panels. The plant is located in an area that has large access to hydroelectric power. The carbon fibre is then shipped to Germany, where it first gets fabricated and is then shipped to the automotive production plant in Leipzig. In October 2017 the BMW Group reported that the 100,000th BMW i3 had been built. BMW sold its stake in the Moses Lake plant in 2017, but continues to receive fibre from the plant. , BMW plans to continue i3 production until 2024, and there are no plans for an i3 successor. The 200,000th i3 was produced in the Leipzig plant on 15 October 2020.

Markets and sales 
The first i3 deliveries to retail customers in Europe took place at the official market launch ceremony held in Munich on 15 November 2013. The i3 was also launched in the UK in November 2013. The release in the American market took place in May 2014. , the core phase of the market introduction of the i3 was finished, with only some smaller markets are still to follow.

The i3 ranked third among all-electric cars sold worldwide in 2014. By mid-2014, Norway had the world's largest i3 market penetration per capita due to its population size, BMW i3 sales grew from 16,052 units in 2014 to 24,057 in 2015, allowing the i3 to rank for the second year in a row as the  world's third best selling all-electric car. Also in 2015 the i3 ranked fifth among the world's top selling plug-in electric cars. About 25,500 units were delivered worldwide in 2016, up 6% from 2015, allowing the BMW i3 to rank in 2016 for the third year running as the world's third best-selling all-electric car. In 2016 the i3 also ranked as the fifth top selling plug-in electric car. Global sales totalled 31,482 i3s in 2017, and 34,829 in 2018. All sales figures include the REx variant.

Since its introduction, global cumulative sales totalled about 65,500 units through December 2016, making the i3 the world's all-time third best-selling all-electric car after the Nissan Leaf and the Tesla Model S. These figure includes REx sales.  The BMW i3 ranked as the top selling new passenger car model in Norway in November 2016, capturing a market share of 7.7% of total monthly new car sales. , the i3 continued as the top selling BMW electrified model, and accounted for 60% of combined BMW i and BMW iPerformance models.

BMW i3 sales since inception totalled more than 165,000 units delivered worldwide . The United States is the largest market with 41,988 units delivered through December 2019. Norway is also a top market with 25,156 new units registered through mid-June 2020. Sales in the UK 10,000 units in March 2018.

BMW i8 

The BMW i8 plug-in hybrid was the production version of the BMW Vision Efficient Dynamics concept unveiled at the 2009 Frankfurt Motor Show. Powering the front wheels was an electric motor (131 hp), while the rear wheels made use of a 1.5-litre 3-cylinder gasoline engine (231 hp). Zero to 60 mph sprint timings was estimated to be less than 4.5 seconds using both power sources. The positioning of the motor and engine over the axles also makes it benefit from a 50/50 weight distribution.

The production version of the i8 was unveiled at the 2013 Frankfurt Motor Show, together with the all electric BMW i3. Since 2014 through 2019, the BMW i8 has been the safety car in the FIA Formula E Championship.

The BMW i8 Roadster concept was unveiled at the 2012 Beijing Auto Show. The production version of the BMW i8 Roadster was premiered in late 2017, and delivery of the first 18 exclusive first edition units took place in May 2018.

The battery capacity of both models, coupé and roadster, was increased to a gross energy content of 11.6 kWh.

The 20,000th i8 was produced in December 2019, one of the limited Ultimate Sophisto Edition models. The production cycle ended with the last remaining units of the 200 Ultimate Sophisto Edition vehicles in June 2020.

Markets and sales 
BMW expected the U.S. to be the largest sales market. In Europe, the UK, Germany and France are expected to be the top markets. Retail deliveries began in Germany in June 2014. Deliveries to retail customers in the U.S. started in August 2014.

, global sales totalled 7,197 i8s, of which, 1,741 units were sold in 2014, and 5,456 in 2015. In 2015 global sales of the BMW i8 exceeded the combined figure of all other hybrid sports cars produced by other manufacturers. Global cumulative sales reached more than 10,000 BMW i8s by early November 2016. The U.S. was the top i8 market with 6,776 units sold through December 2019. By March 2020, worldwide sales since inception totalled more than 20,000 units, making the i8 the world's top selling plug-in electric sports cars, and exceeding sales of all competitors in its segment combined.

BMW iX 

The BMW iX is the first purpose-built electric vehicle by BMW since the i3 from 2013. The iX nameplate was chosen to signify the model's position at the top of the electric BMW i line-up and its role in showcasing technology. The electric platform is a "totally new development", though it is "highly compatible" with the modular CLAR platform. BMW plans the iX to become the basis for fleets of fully autonomous vehicles for highway use, and eventually to be available as Robo-Taxis in cities.

Life-Drive 
Both the i3 and i8 will benefit from BMW's Life-Drive platform which makes use of light-weight materials. Both cars will come with an aluminium chassis, and in the case of the i8, the windshield, top, doors and fenders are made from polycarbonate glass, with the body having a drag coefficient of 0.26.

EPA ratings 
The following are the BMW i3 (both 60 and 94 ampere hour per hour batteries) and i8 U.S. Environmental Protection Agency (EPA) ratings for all-electric range and fuel economy.

BMW iPerformance 

Launched in Europe and the U.S. in 2015, the BMW X5 xDrive40e is the first plug-in hybrid released under the core BMW brand. The use of BMW's eDrive technology on the established X5 platform is a direct technology transfer from the BMW i cars, in particular, from the BMW i8 technology.

In February 2016, BMW announced the introduction of the "iPerformance" model designation, which was given to all BMW plug-in hybrid vehicles from July 2016. The aim is to provide a visible indicator of the transfer of technology from BMW i to the BMW core brand. The first BMW car launched to the market with the "iPerformance" model designation was the BMW 330e iPerformance, initially named the 330e. Deliveries in the American market began in the second quarter of 2016. The new designation was also used on the plug-in hybrid variants of the new BMW 7 Series, the BMW 740e iPerformance. The iPerformance models have a BMW i logo on the front side panel, BMW i-style blue elements in the kidney grille and wheel hubs, and an eDrive logo on the C-pillar.

, four BMW electrified models had been released, the BMW X5 xDrive40e, BMW 225xe Active Tourer, BMW 330e iPerformance, and the BMW 740e iPerformance. The BMW 530e iPerformance was released in Europe March 2017 as part of the seventh generation BMW 5 Series line-up. The Mini Cooper S E Countryman ALL4 plug-in hybrid was released in June 2017. The BMW X1 xDrive25e crossover was introduced in January 2020. The BMW X3 xDrive30e was released in Europe in the first quarter of 2020. Sales of the BMW X2 xDrive25e crossover are slated to begin in Europe in July 2020.

Gallery

See also 
 Electric car
 Electric car use by country
 Government incentives for plug-in electric vehicles
 List of modern production plug-in electric vehicles
 Plug-in electric vehicle
 Plug-in hybrid

References

External links 

 
 BMW i3. From the first idea to the final car, BMW, July 2014 (YouTube)

 
Electric vehicle manufacturers of Germany